Renton is a city in King County, Washington, United States, and an inner-ring suburb of Seattle. As of the 2020 census, the population of Renton was 106,785, up from 90,927 at the 2010 census. The city is currently the sixth-largest municipality in greater Seattle and the ninth-largest in Washington state.

After a long history as an important salmon fishing area for Native Americans, Renton was first settled by people of European descent in the 1860s. Its early economy was based on coal mining, clay production, and timber export. Today, Renton is best known as the final assembly point for the Boeing 737 family of commercial airplanes, but it is also home to a growing number of well-known manufacturing, technology, and healthcare organizations, including Boeing Commercial Airplanes Division, Paccar, Kaiser Permanente, IKEA, Providence Health & Services, UW Medicine, and Wizards of the Coast.

History
Long a cultural center for the Duwamish, European settlers arrived in the area of present-day Renton in the 1870s. First among them were Henry Tobin and his wife Diana. The town of Renton was accessed via the Seattle and Walla Walla Railroad, the first railroad to be built to Seattle, and was in the vicinity of several coal mines that attracted entrepreneurs like Erasmus M. Smithers, who is credited with the founding and establishment of the town in 1875. Smithers named Renton in honor of Captain William Renton, a local lumber and shipping merchant who invested heavily in the coal trade. Smithers discovered coal there and brought in Charles D. Shattuck as the coal mine operator.

Renton was incorporated as a city on September 6, 1901, when coal mining and timber processing were the most important economic industries in the area. The town was prone to flooding from the Cedar River and Black River. In 1916 the completion of the Lake Washington Ship Canal lowered the surface of Lake Washington by several feet which consequently eliminated drainage of Lake Washington through the Black River (in favor of the Ship Canal). The Cedar River was then diverted to drain into Lake Washington instead of into the Black River. As a result, the Black River largely disappeared, leaving only a few remnants. The culmination of these actions reduced the threat of annual flooding.

The population sharply increased during World War II when Boeing built their Renton Factory to produce the B-29 Superfortress. Renton grew from a population of 4,488 in 1940 to 16,039 in 1950.

The game company Wizards of the Coast also is headquartered in Renton. Providence Health System has centralized its administrative offices in Renton, along with Group Health Cooperative.

Owing to its location at the confluence of three major freeways (I-5, I-405, and SR 167), Renton's economic development team has lured a number of specialty retailers that draw consumers from around the region, including IKEA. Some retail establishments were unwanted though, and the city successfully defended zoning restrictions on pornographic theaters before the U.S. Supreme Court in Renton v. Playtime Theatres, Inc.

The Renton Public Library was built directly over the Cedar River and opened in 1966.

21st-century redevelopment

The city government has encouraged redevelopment of industrial areas around Downtown Renton and near Southcenter since the 1980s. The first IKEA in the Pacific Northwest opened in Renton in 1994. The former Longacres horse-racing track was redeveloped in the 1990s to support offices for Boeing and the Federal Reserve Bank, which moved from its Seattle building. Port Quendall, a land parcel in north Renton, is home to the Virginia Mason Athletic Center (VMAC), housing the Seattle Seahawks Headquarters and training facility that opened in August 2008; before then, the Seahawks trained in Kirkland.

In the mid-1990s, Renton undertook a major redevelopment effort to revitalize its downtown core, which had declined in commercial prominence since the opening of the Southcenter Mall in Tukwila in 1968. The many car dealerships that had previously occupied the center of downtown Renton were encouraged through economic incentives to relocate to a newly created auto sales zone close to the I-405/SR-167 interchange. In place of the old dealerships downtown, a new transit center and parking garage were built in partnership with King County Metro. The transit center is surrounded by several multi-family residential buildings and a small town square named Piazza Park, which hosts a weekly farmers' market.

Centered on former Boeing Co. property near the south shore of Lake Washington is a  residential and commercial development named The Landing. To the north of the Landing, a hotel and office development on the lakefront called Southport has been developed at the site of the former Shuffleton power plant, which was demolished in 2001. A 347-room hotel operated under the Hyatt Regency brand opened in June 2017.

Geography
Renton is located at  (47.486622, −122.195163), on the southeast shore of Lake Washington.

Potential Annexation Areas (PAAs) include the communities of Fairwood southeast of Renton, the East Renton Plateau on the eastern edge of Renton, and West Hill northwest of Renton. These communities are large unincorporated urban areas that are encouraged by the King County Annexation Initiative to incorporate as cities or annex into neighboring cities. As of 2012 these three PAAs are not part of the City of Renton, and not included in its demographics or statistics.

Renton one of the cities in the Puget Sound Region with an independent street grid system. Roads names beginning with sectional divisions (N 32nd ST) generally follow a latitudinal direction, while roads names ending in a sectional direction (Duvall Ave NE) generally follow a longitudinal direction. Many of the avenues in the city are named in honor of other cities in Washington.

Renton is bordered to the north by Newcastle. Along the east side of Renton is the Urban Growth Boundary established by King County, as such there is no incorporated city directly east of Renton. The geographical characteristics of Renton's eastern border are varied and include (from north to south) the south flank of Cougar Mountain descending southward merging with the community of May Valley. The terrain then elevates south of May Valley to the communities of the East Renton Plateau before descending to the north bank of the Cedar River. Renton is bordered to the south by the city of Kent. The western border consists of the city of Tukwila, and finally the unincorporated King County community West Hill and Lake Washington to the northwest.

Areas
 Downtown Renton
 In 2015, ESRI estimated that in Downtown Renton the total population was 3,019 and the average household income was $50,809.
 North Renton
 In 2015, ESRI estimated that in North Renton the total population was 8,211 and the average household income was $79,387.
 Northeast Renton
 In 2015, ESRI estimated that in Northeast Renton the total population was 44,626 and the average household income was $93,556.
 Southeast Renton
 In 2015, ESRI estimated that in Southeast Renton the total population was 39,066 and the average household income was $78,424.
 Southwest Renton
 In 2015, ESRI estimated that in Southwest Renton the total population was 3,551 and the average household income was $64,661.

Climate
Renton has a warm-summer Mediterranean climate (Köppen: Csb) with warm and dry summers mixed with cloudy, wet and cool winters, with a precipitation regime typical of the Pacific Northwest. Being located in a partial rain shadow and shielded from the coastal summers, Renton has more of a climate influenced by the interior than many other areas nearby.

Demographics

2010 census
As of the census of 2010, there were 90,927 people, 36,009 households, and 21,849 families residing in the city. The racial makeup of the city was 54.6% White (49.4% Non-Hispanic White), 10.6% African American, 0.7% Native American, 21.2% Asian, 0.8% Pacific Islander, 6.2% from other races, and 5.8% from two or more races. Hispanic or Latino of any race were 13.1% of the population.

There were 36,009 households, of which 32.4% had children under the age of 18 living with them, 43.2% were married couples living together, 11.9% had a female householder with no husband present, 5.5% had a male householder with no wife present, and 39.3% were non-families. 30.3% of all households were made up of individuals, and 7.9% had someone living alone who was 65 years of age or older. The average household size was 2.51 and the average family size was 3.16.

The median age in the city was 35.2 years. 23.2% of residents were under the age of 18; 8.8% were between the ages of 18 and 24; 33.5% were from 25 to 44; 24.4% were from 45 to 64; and 10.1% were 65 years of age or older. The gender makeup of the city was 49.5% male and 50.5% female.

Economy

Boeing Commercial Airplanes, Boeing Capital, Providence Health & Services, and Wizards of the Coast have their headquarters in Renton.

The Boeing Renton Factory has operated since World War II, when it manufactured the B-29 Superfortress; currently, it produces the 737 airliner. The Renton plant produced the Jetfoil and Pegasus class hydrofoils in the 1970s. As of 2001, 40% of all commercial aircraft in the air were assembled in Renton. Boeing remains the largest employer in Renton, which is home to over 10,000 employees and three of the aerospace giant's six major business divisions: Boeing Commercial Airplanes, Boeing Capital Corporation and the Shared Services Group. The local newspaper in the 1970s, the Record Chronicle, proclaimed the city the jet capital of the world.

Paccar has traditionally been a large employer in the city as well with its Kenworth Truck plant located in Renton's industrial area on the south end of Lake Washington. In 1907 the Seattle Car Mfg Company also known as the Car Company moved to a large manufacturing plant in Renton after demand for the company's railroad equipment exceeded the capacity of its Seattle plant. The Car Company was the only manufacturer of train cars on the west coast.

The Renton plant expanded to foundry capabilities in 1911, and Seattle Car and Foundry Co merged with the Twohy Brothers of Portland in 1917 and became the Pacific Car and Foundry Company or Paccar. During the great depression the Renton Paccar plant developed power winches for use in the logging industry. When World War II arrived the Renton manufacturing switched its production towards the war effort, and by the war's end in 1945 had built 1,500 Sherman Tanks. In the second half of the 20th century there was not enough repeat business for Paccar-built train cars as rail equipment in 1965 came to only 1/3 of the company's sales. Thus the Paccar Renton plant began manufacturing structural steel until the 1970s recession. In the early 1980s the Paccar Railcar Division; the last remnants of the original Pacific Car and Foundry Co closed down. In 1993, a new Kenworth assembly plant opened on the former site of Pacific Car and Foundry.

Top employers
As of 2016 the top employers in the city are:

Education
Renton Technical College, originally opened in 1942 as a war production school, offers associate degrees and certificates of completion in professional-technical fields.

The Renton School District provides K–12 public schooling. Additionally, the Issaquah School District serves a small portion of unincorporated Renton neighborhoods. The Tahoma School District serves a small portion of Renton along Maple Valley Highway. The Kent School District serves the majority of Fairwood, a census-designated place between Renton and Maple Valley.

The Renton School District includes the four high schools: Hazen High School, Lindbergh High School, Renton High School, and Albert Talley Senior High School. The school district also has four middle schools and fifteen elementary schools.

Parts of the city are also served by the Issaquah School District, Kent School District, and the Tahoma School District, all of which predominantly serve neighboring cities.

Government

Renton has a mayor–council government that oversees municipal services and contracts with other entities for utilities. The mayor and seven councilmembers are elected to four-year terms in staggered, at-large elections. Councilmembers are divided into working committees that recommend legislation to the whole council in meetings.

Sister cities
Renton has two sister cities:
  Nishiwaki, Hyogo, Japan (since 1969) 
  Cuautla, Jalisco, Mexico (since 2001)

Transportation

Renton is served by King County Metro and Sound Transit Express buses. Metro operates the RapidRide F Line through the city and plans to expand bus rapid transit service in the 2020s; Sound Transit is scheduled to open its own bus rapid transit service, Stride along the Interstate 405 corridor through Renton in 2026.

The city government owns and operates Renton Municipal Airport (KRNT), officially Clayton Scott Field, a public airport at the foot of Lake Washington. It is used by the Boeing Renton Factory as well as for charter services and flight training.

Notable people
 Val Caniparoli, ballet dancer and choreographer
 Jamal Crawford, basketball player
 Clint Eastwood, actor and director
 Joshua Farris, figure skater, was born in Renton
 Avery Garrett, former Mayor of Renton (1969) and state legislator
 Sally Jewell, 51st United States Secretary of the Interior and former CEO of REI
 Sean Kinney, drummer for Alice in Chains
 Zach LaVine, basketball player
 Sam Longoria, Hollywood producer-director
 Rick May, voice actor and theatrical director and actor
 Emily Rose, actress
 Brandon Roy, basketball player
 Doug Sisk, baseball player
 Aretha Thurmond, Olympic discus thrower
 Jimi Hendrix, musician
 Jacob Young, actor and producer

References

External links

 Renton city government webpage

 
Cities in Washington (state)
Cities in King County, Washington
Cities in the Seattle metropolitan area
Populated places established in 1901
1901 establishments in Washington (state)